James Gotheridge (born 1863) was an English association footballer who played as a left winger for Newton Heath in the late 1880s. He signed for the Heathens as a 21-year-old in 1884, but made only 37 competitive appearances for the club. In October 1889, Gotheridge was suspended by the Football Association for three months for an incident during a match against Walsall Town Swifts. He played one more match for the club before being transferred to West Manchester.

References

1863 births
Footballers from Derby
English footballers
Association football wingers
Manchester United F.C. players
Year of death unknown
Football Alliance players